Shaadi Ke Siyape (Wedding Problems) is an Indian television comedy series produced by Sonali Jaffer under Full House Media. It premiered on 16 March 2019 on &TV. It stars Mishkat Varma and Sheen Dass.

Plot
Fancy Aunty, a wedding planner and the owner of a marriage hall encounters a group of aliens from Jupiter who are on a mission and hires them as her assistants.

Cast

Main 
 Sheen Dass as Bijli
Mishkat Varma as Viraat
Bhavya Gandhi as Nanku
Rahul Singh as Pandit
Alka Kaushal as Fancy Aunty
Ankita Bahuguna as Katrina

Special appearances
Shagun Pandey in Episodes 1
Dolly Chawla in Episodes 1
Shaily Priya Pandey as Sweety in Episodes 4
Siddharth Sen in Episodes 4
Gaurav Sharma as Shaurya in Episodes 5
Kstij Soni as Tripti in Episodes 5
Chandani Bhagwani in Episodes 7
Bhavya Sachdeva in Episodes 7
Khushwant Walia in Episodes 11
Amika Shail as Prachi (bride) in Episodes 18

Episodes

References 

&TV original programming
2019 Indian television series debuts
Indian science fiction television series
Indian television sitcoms
Television series about alien visitations
Wedding television shows